Yang Xinhai (July 17, 1968 – February 14, 2004), also known as  Yang Zhiya, and Yang Liu, was a Chinese serial killer who confessed to committing 67 murders and 23 rapes between 1999 and 2003. He was sentenced to death and executed. He was dubbed the "Monster Killer" by the media. He is the most prolific known serial killer China has seen since the establishment of the People's Republic of China in 1949.

Biography 
Yang was born on July 29, 1968, in Zhengyang County, Henan. His family was one of the poorest in their village. The youngest of four children, Yang was clever and introverted. He dropped out of school in 1985, at age 17, and refused to return home, instead travelling around China and working as a laborer.

Crimes

In 1988 and 1991, Yang was sentenced to labor camps for theft in Xi'an, Shaanxi and Shijiazhuang, Hebei. In 1996, he was sentenced to five years in prison for attempted rape in Zhumadian, Henan and released in 1999.

Yang's killings took place between 1999 and 2003 in the provinces of Anhui, Hebei, Henan and Shandong. At night, he would enter his victims' homes, and kill all of the occupants—mainly farmers—with axes, hammers, and shovels, sometimes killing entire families. Each time he wore new clothes and large shoes.

In October 2002, Yang killed a father and a six-year-old girl with a shovel and raped a pregnant woman, who survived the attack with serious head injuries.

Arrest, trial and execution 
Yang was detained on November 3, 2003, after acting suspiciously during a routine police inspection of entertainment venues in Cangzhou, Hebei. Police took him in for questioning and discovered that he was wanted for murder in four provinces. Yang was sentenced to death by the Luohe City Intermediate People's Court, Henan, on February 1, 2004. At the time of his sentencing, official Chinese media believed he had carried out China's longest and grisliest killing spree. Yang was executed on 14 February 2004 by firing squad.

Motive 
According to some media reports at the time of his arrest, Yang's motive for the killings was revenge against society as a result of a break up. Allegedly his girlfriend had left him because of his previous sentences for theft and rape. Later media reports claimed that his enjoyment of robbery, rape and murder was the motive.

While Yang never formally provided a motive, he was quoted as saying: "When I killed people I had a desire. This inspired me to kill more. I don't care whether they deserve to live or not. It is none of my concern...I have no desire to be part of society. Society is not my concern."

List of his serial murders 
 19 September 2000, Guozhuang Village, Beijiao Township, Chuanhui District, Zhoukou, Henan, 2 murders  
 1 October 2000, Chunshuzhuang, Xiaoying Village, Wangdian Town, Yingzhou District, Fuyang, Anhui, 3 murders, 1 rape 
 15 August 2001, Fangcheliu Village, Juling Township, Linying County, Luohe, Henan, 3 murders, 1 rape 
 Autumn 2001, Kanglou Township, Xihua County, Zhoukou, Henan, 2 murders
 Winter 2001, a village southeast of the county town of Ye County, Pingdingshan, Henan, 2 murders  
 27 January 2002, Tongxu County, Kaifeng, Henan, 3 murders, 1 rape 
 30 June 2002, Chaigang Township, Fugou County, Zhoukou, Henan, 4 murders, 1 rape 
 28 July 2002, Dengzhou, Nanyang, Henan, 4 murders, 2 rapes 
 22 October 2002, Zhaihu Village, Songji Township, Xiping County, Zhumadian, Henan, 2 murders, 1 rape, 1 seriously injured
 8 November 2002, Gaoli Village, Shaodian Township, Shangcai County, Zhumadian, Henan, 4 murders, 2 rapes, 1 seriously injured
 16 November 2002, Liuzhuang Village, Zhangshi Town, Weishi County, Kaifeng, Henan, 2 murders, 1 rape 
 19 November 2002, Shiguai Village, Wangmeng Township, Linying County, Luohe, Henan, 2 murders
 1 December 2002, Yanwan Village, Wangpiliu Town, Luyi County, Zhoukou, Henan, 2 murders, 1 rape, 1 seriously injured
 6 December 2002, Liuzhuang Village, Renhe Township, Xiping County, Zhumadian, Henan, 5 murders, 1 rape 
 13 December 2002, Sijia Village, Malan Township, Yanling County, Xuchang, Henan, 2 murders 
 15 December 2002, Xiaolizhuang, Miaocha Town, Linquan County, Fuyang, Anhui, 3 murders, 1 rape
 5 February 2003, Kuzhuang Township, Xiangcheng County, Xuchang, Henan, 3 murders, 1 rape, 1 seriously injured 
 18 February 2003, Chiying Township, Xihua County, Zhoukou, Henan, 4 murders, 2 rapes 
 23 March 2003, Chengguan Town, Minquan County, Shangqiu, Henan, 4 murders, 1 rape 
 2 April 2003, Sanlizhai Village, Taoyuan Town, Cao County, Heze, Shandong, 2 murders
 5 August 2003, Lidao Village, Xingtai, Hebei, 3 murders 
8 August 2003, Dongliangxiang Village, Qiaoxi District, Shijiazhuang, Hebei, 5 murders 
Totals: 26 incidents, 67 murders, 23 rapes, 10 intentional serious injuries

See also
 List of serial killers by country
 List of serial killers by number of victims
 Huang Hu

References

External links
"China executes mass murderer". BBC News. Saturday 14 February 2004.
"Man faces death after killing 67" (Archive). China Daily. 2 February 2004.
Serial killers in China

1968 births
1988 crimes in China 
1991 crimes in China 
1996 crimes in China 
1999 murders in China 
2000 murders in China 
2001 murders in China 
2002 murders in China 
2003 murders in China 
2004 deaths
20th-century Chinese criminals
21st-century Chinese criminals
21st-century executions by China
Chinese male criminals
Chinese mass murderers
Chinese murderers of children
Chinese people convicted of murder
Chinese rapists
Executed Chinese serial killers
Executed mass murderers
Executed people from Henan
Executed People's Republic of China people
Family murders
Male serial killers
People convicted of murder by the People's Republic of China
People executed by China by firearm
People executed for murder
People from Zhumadian
Serial mass murderers